Bridport East Street was a railway station on the Bridport Railway in the west of the English county of Dorset. Opened on 11 March 1884, before the extension terminus at West Bay, it was just south of the level crossing on the A35 Dorchester to Honiton road,  slightly nearer the centre of Bridport than the main station at Bradpole Road. Closed during the First World War and again in 1921, the station closed permanently with the West Bay extension on 22 September 1930, when the Great Western Railway gave up on hopes of creating a resort at West Bay.

The site today
Nothing is now left as the site has been under the A35 Bridport town centre bypass for many years.

Further reading 

 Railways of Dorset J.H.Lucking Railway Correspondence and Travel Society 1968 (no ISBN)

References

 
 
 
 Station on navigable O.S. map

Disused railway stations in Dorset
Former Great Western Railway stations
Railway stations in Great Britain opened in 1884
Railway stations in Great Britain closed in 1916
Railway stations in Great Britain opened in 1920
Railway stations in Great Britain closed in 1921
Railway stations in Great Britain opened in 1921
Railway stations in Great Britain closed in 1924
Railway stations in Great Britain opened in 1924
Railway stations in Great Britain closed in 1930
Bridport